Jemma Elizabeth Purfield (born 21 February 1997) is an English professional footballer who plays for  club Leicester City.

Early years
Purfield began her career with Doncaster Rovers Belles, making her senior first team debut on 20 April 2013 as a halftime substitute in a 4–0 WSL defeat to Chelsea. In doing so she became Doncaster's youngest WSL player. Purfield moved to newly founded Durham during the 2014 season, scoring three goals in their inaugural WSL 2 campaign as the team finished 6th.

College career
In 2015, Purfield moved to the United States on a college soccer scholarship, first with South Alabama Jaguars before transferring to Arizona State Sun Devils after two seasons. She captained both teams and earned several individual awards including Sun Belt Conference Freshman of the Year in 2015, and SBC Player of the Year in 2016.

Professional career

Liverpool
Purfield declared for the 2019 NWSL College Draft but was not selected. She instead returned to England and signed a contract with FA WSL club Liverpool in January 2019.

Bristol City
Following Liverpool's relegation, Purfield left upon the expiration of her contract and remained in the WSL after signing a two-year contract with Bristol City. She made 27 appearances for Bristol in all competitions including in the 2021 FA Women's League Cup Final as Bristol City finished runners-up to Chelsea. Purfield left at the end of the season following the team's relegation.

Career statistics

Club

References

External links

1997 births
Women's association football defenders
Women's Super League players
English women's footballers
England women's under-23 international footballers
Doncaster Rovers Belles L.F.C. players
Durham W.F.C. players
Liverpool F.C. Women players
Leicester City W.F.C. players
Living people
Sportspeople from Beverley
Footballers from the East Riding of Yorkshire
Arizona State Sun Devils women's soccer players
South Alabama Jaguars women's soccer players
Expatriate women's soccer players in the United States
English expatriate sportspeople in the United States